Federico Piazza (born March 2, 1987 in Albenga) is an Italian professional football player who is currently unattached.

External links
 

1987 births
Living people
People from Albenga
Italian footballers
Italy youth international footballers
U.S. Cremonese players
U.S. Massese 1919 players
Italian expatriate footballers
Expatriate footballers in Switzerland
Italian expatriate sportspeople in Switzerland
FC La Chaux-de-Fonds players
Association football midfielders
Footballers from Liguria
Sportspeople from the Province of Savona